The Arab Women's Club Championship is an annual basketball tournament for Arab teams for women. Right to participate in this competition achieved champions of Arab states, however there is a possibility that from one country participates more clubs. The competition was founded in 1990.

History

Results

Finals

Titles by team

Titles by country

See also
Arab Club Basketball Championship

References

External links
 Competition standings at goalzz.com

Basketball
Basketball club competitions in Africa
Basketball club competitions in Asia
International club basketball competitions
Women's basketball competitions in Asia
Women's basketball competitions in Africa